Minimalist cinema is related to the art and philosophy of minimalism.

Notable filmmakers

This type of film includes the works of directors like:
Robert Bresson
Chloe Zhao 
Kelly Reichardt 
Yasujiro Ozu 
Gus van Sant 
Andy Warhol 
Morgan Fisher 
Don Hertzfeldt 
James Benning 
Jafar Panahi 
Jim Jarmusch 
Alexander Sokurov 
Norman McLaren 
Michelangelo Antonioni 
Hollis Frampton 
Peter Roehr 
Ernie Gehr 
John Cassavetes 
Walter Hill 
John Carpenter 
Don Siegel 
Michael Snow 
Larry Gottheim
Abbas Kiarostami

List of notable minimalist films

The Passion of Joan of Arc (Carl Theodore Dreyer, 1928)
Dots (Norman McLaren, 1940)
Rope (Alfred Hitchcock, 1948)
Gerald McBoing Boing (Robert Cannon, 1951)
The Tell Tale Heart (Ted Parmelee, 1953)
Tokyo Story (Yasujiro Ozu, 1953)
Ordet (Carl Theodore Dreyer, 1955)
A Man Escaped (Robert Bresson, 1956)
12 Angry Men (Sidney Lumet, 1957)
Plan 9 from Outer Space (Ed Wood, 1959)
An Autumn Afternoon (Yasujiro Ozu, 1962)
Red Desert (Michelangelo Antonioni, 1964)
Au Hasard Balthazar (Robert Bresson, 1966)
Mouchette (Robert Bresson, 1967)
Playtime (Jacques Tati, 1967)
Wavelength (Michael Snow, 1967)
2001: A Space Odyssey (Stanley Kubrick, 1968)
Surface Tension (Hollis Frampton, 1968)
Bambi Meets Godzilla (Marv Newland, 1969)
Lemon (Hollis Frampton, 1969)
Serene Velocity (Ernie Gehr, 1970)
Duel (Steven Spielberg, 1971)
Silent Running (Douglas Trumbull, 1972)
Sisyphus (Marcell Jankovics, 1974)
Jeanne Dielman, 23 quai du Commerce, 1080 Bruxelles (Chantal Ackerman, 1975)
Assault on Precinct 13 (John Carpenter, 1976)
Taxi Driver (Martin Scorsese, 1976)
Suspiria (Dario Argento, 1977)
Days of Heaven (Terrence Malick, 1978)
The Driver (Walter Hill, 1978)
Halloween (John Carpenter 1978)
Mad Max (George Miller, 1979)
My Dinner with Andre (Louis Malle, 1981)
Liquid Sky (Slava Tsukerman, 1982)
Koyaanisqatsi (Godfrey Reggio, 1983)
Secret Honor (Robert Altman, 1984)
Stranger Than Paradise (Jim Jarmusch, 1984)
Down by Law (Jim Jarmusch, 1986)
Swimming to Cambodia (Jonathan Demme, 1987)
Alice (Jan Svankmajer, 1988)
Leningrad Cowboys Go America (Aki Kaurismaki, 1989)
The Seventh Continent (Michael Haneke, 1989)
The Match Factory Girl, (Aki Kaurismäki, 1990)
Chungking Express (Wong Kar-wai, 1994)
Clerks (Kevin Smith, 1994)
Before Sunrise (Richard Linklater, 1995) and the sequels Before Sunset (2004) and Before Midnight (2013)
Safe (Todd Haynes, 1995)
Gattaca (Andrew Niccol, 1997)
Little Dieter Needs to Fly (Werner Herzog, 1997)
A Taste of Cherry (Abbas Kiarostami, 1997)
Festen (Thomas Vinterberg, 1998)
American Beauty (Sam Mendes, 1999)
The Blair Witch Project (Daniel Myrick and Eduardo Sánchez, 1999)
The Wind Will Carry Us (Abbas Kiarostami, 1999)
Cast Away (Robert Zemeckis, 2000)
Y tu mamá también (Alfonso Cuaron, 2001)
Tape (Richard Linklater, 2001)
Gerry (Gus van Sant, 2002)
Ten (Abbas Kiarostami, 2002)
Dogville (Lars von Trier, 2003)
Open Water (Chris Kentis, 2003)
Napoleon Dynamite (Jared Hess, 2004)
Brick (Rian Johnson, 2005)
The Death of Mr. Lazarescu (Cristi Puiu, 2005)
Hard Candy (David Slade, 2005)
Old Joy (Kelly Reichardt, 2006)
I'm Not There (Todd Haynes, 2007)
Once (John Carney, 2007)
Baghead (Jay and Mark Duplass, 2008)
Wall-E (Andrew Stanton, 2008)
Wendy and Lucy (Kelly Reichardt, 2008)
500 Days of Summer (Marc Webb, 2009)
Moon (Duncan Jones, 2009)
127 Hours (Danny Boyle, 2010)
Beyond the Black Rainbow (Panos Cosmatos, 2010)
Winter's Bone (Debra Granik, 2010)
Hanna (Joe Wright, 2011)
Once Upon a Time in Anatolia (Nuri Bilge Ceylan, 2011)
The Turin Horse (Ágnes Hranitzky and Bela Tarr, 2011)
It's Such a Beautiful Day (Don Hertzfeldt, 2012)
Moonrise Kingdom (Wes Anderson, 2012)
All Is Lost (J.C. Chandor, 2013)
Gravity (Alfonso Cuaron, 2013)
Her (Spike Jonze, 2013)
Locke (Steven Knight, 2013)
Only Lovers Left Alive (Jim Jarmusch, 2013)
Under the Skin (Jonathan Glazer, 2013)
Visitors (Godfrey Reggio, 2013)
Ex Machina (Alex Garland, 2014)
It Follows (David Robert Mitchell, 2014)
The Revenant (Alejandro G. Inarritu, 2015)
Room (Lenny Abrahamson, 2015)
Certain Women (Kelly Reichardt, 2016)
The Red Turtle (Michael Dudok de Wit, 2016)
10 Cloverfield Lane (Dan Trachtenberg, 2016)
Lady Bird (Greta Gerwig, 2017)
The Rider (Chloe Zhao, 2017)
Roma (Alfonso Cuaron, 2018)
Away (Gints Zilbalodis, 2019)
First Cow (Kelly Reichardt, 2019)
A Quiet Place (John Krasinski, 2018)
Sound of Metal (Darius Marder, 2019)
If Anything Happens I Love You (Will McCormack and Michael Govier, 2020)
Minari (Lee Isaac Chung, 2020)
Nomadland (Chloe Zhao, 2020)
Wolfwalkers (Tomm Moore and Ross Stewart, 2020)
The Woman Who Ran (Hong Sang-soo, 2020)
Belfast (Kenneth Branagh, 2021)
Dune (Denis Villeneuve, 2021)
The Tragedy of Macbeth (Joel Coen, 2021)
Marcel the Shell with Shoes On (Dean Fleischer Camp, 2022)
My Year of Dicks (Sara Gunnarsdóttir, 2022)
Saint Omer (Alice Diop, 2022)
Tár (Todd Field, 2022)
Women Talking (Sarah Polley, 2022)
Sources:

See also
Arthouse animation
Maximalist film
Postmodernist film
Slow cinema
Romanian New Wave
Minimalist music
Art film
American Eccentric Cinema
Modernist film
Arthouse musical
Vulgar auteurism
Indiewood

References

External links
Minimalism and Maximalism: The 42nd New York Film Festival - Senses of Cinema

Postmodern art
1940s in film
1950s in film
1960s in film
1970s in film
1980s in film
1990s in film
2000s in film
2010s in film
2020s in film
Film genres
Modern art
1950s in animation
2010s in animation
2020s in animation